Mary O. Ekstrom (born November 11, 1951) is a North Dakota Democratic-NPL Party member of the North Dakota House of Representatives, representing the 11th district from 1999 to 2011.

External links
North Dakota Legislative Assembly - Representative Mary Ekstrom official ND Senate website
Project Vote Smart - Representative Mary Ekstrom (ND) profile
Follow the Money - Mary Ekstrom
2006 2002 1998 campaign contributions
North Dakota Democratic-NPL Party - Representative Mary Ekstrom profile

Members of the North Dakota House of Representatives
1951 births
Living people
Women state legislators in North Dakota
20th-century American politicians
20th-century American women politicians
21st-century American politicians
21st-century American women politicians
Politicians from Baltimore
Politicians from Fargo, North Dakota